Periclimenaeus maxillulidens is a species of shrimp of the family Palaemonidae. Periclimenaeus maxillulidens is found off the coasts of Florida, Panama, and Mexico.

References

Palaemonidae
Biota of the Gulf of Mexico
Fauna of Mexico
Fauna of Panama
Crustaceans described in 1936